Here Come the Jets is a 1959 American aviation drama film directed by Gene Fowler, Jr. and written by Louis Vittes. The API, the B picture unit of 20th Century Fox was involved. Here Come the Jets stars Steve Brodie, Lyn Thomas, Mark Dana, John Doucette, Jean Carson and Carleton Young.

Plot
Ex-USAF pilot, and now an alcoholic, James Logan (Steve Brodie) resorts to pawning his Distinguished Service Medal awarded in the Korean War. to raise money for his next drink. Jailed for disorderly conduct, after a fight at a seedy nightclub, his arrest makes headlines. His friend, Ted Wallack (Mark Dana), heads up the test pilot program at the Harrison Air Craft Company, and offers Jim a job. Randall (John Doucette), the no-nonsense head of engineering is wary of Logan and his drinking. Getting lodging at a boarding house owned by Jean Carter (Jean Carson), Logan soon ends up back at a bar where he accidentally spills his drink on Joyce Matthews (Lyn Thomas) who later turns up as the head of the plant's medical department, who will oversee a battery of physical and psychological exams.

As the prototype Harrison airliner nears completion, Logan trains in a flight simulator but the sound of the raring engines causes him to panic. He tries to resign but Randall refuses to accept his resignation, assigning him to be Ted's co-pilot. Company president Burton (Carleton Young) wants Logan to be fired as he is too controversial but Randall refuses.

The night before the maiden flight, at the local restaurant, Logan is greeted by "Logan's Loonies," his old squadron from the war. His former friend, Steve Henley Joe Turkel can not forget what he called "ditching the fight" in Korea and starts a fight. Logan is shaken and is not sure he will be able to go through with the flight.

On the day of the test flight, Randall orders Logan to take the controls from Ted, telling him that "Logan's Loonies" saved his son's life in Korea, and he feels bound to give him a second chance. Encouraged by Randall, Logan confidently takes the controls and safely lands the aircraft.

Cast 

Steve Brodie as James Logan
Lyn Thomas as Joyce Matthews
Mark Dana as Ted Wallack
John Doucette as Randall
Jean Carson as Jean Carter
Carleton Young as Burton
Joe Turkel as Steve Henley (as Joseph Turkel)
I. Stanford Jolley as Bartender
Gloria Moreland as B-Girl
Vikki Dougan as Blonde
B.B. Hughes as Stripper
Walter Maslow as Joe

Production
Originally director Gene Fowler, Jr. intended to collaborate with Louis Vittes on the screenplay. Principal photography on Here Come the Jets started on January 19, 1959. Additional filming took place from mid-late February 1959. As a B film, a great deal of reliance was on stock footage of the new Boeing 707 airliner.

Reception
The film was released in June 1959.

References

Notes

Citations

Bibliography

 Paris, Michael. From the Wright Brothers to Top Gun: Aviation, Nationalism, and Popular Cinema. Manchester, UK: Manchester University Press, 1995. .
 Pendo, Stephen. Aviation in the Cinema. Lanham, Maryland: Scarecrow Press, 1985. .

External links 
 
 

1959 films
20th Century Fox films
American drama films
1959 drama films
Films directed by Gene Fowler Jr.
American aviation films
Films scored by Paul Dunlap
1950s English-language films
1950s American films